Saathii Re is a television show produced by Sphere Origins, that aired on Indian television channel STAR One.

Plot
This is the story of a girl named Suman. Suman is having an affair with a boy named Prem, unknown to her parents. Her parents are looking for a boy for Suman. One day a family comes with the proposal of their son Rajeev for Suman. Suman rejects the proposal, while Rajeev falls for her. Suman's parents force her, which causes her to break ties with Prem and agree to the marriage. Soon Suman falls in love with Rajeev and they get married. After facing problems in their married life, Prem returns. Prem tries to convince Suman that she still loves him, but when Suman refuses to continue the affair he rapes her. Rajeev finds out, while Suman's own sister opposes her and supports Prem.

Cast 
 Parakh Madan as Suman
 Arjun Punj as Prem
 Aamir Dalvi as Rajeev

References

External links
 

Star One (Indian TV channel) original programming
Indian television soap operas
Serial drama television series
2006 Indian television series debuts
2007 Indian television series endings